Roger de Piles's L'Abrégé de la vie des peintres...avec un traité du peintre parfait ( The Art of Painting and the Lives of the Painters), was a major art biography of painters. It was written by the French spy Roger de Piles. In 1692, during the War of the League of Augsburg, he was arrested in the Hague carrying a false passport and imprisoned for the next five years, where he wote his L'Abrégé in 7 parts; 1) Sketch of the perfect painter, 2) Greek painters; 3) Painters from Rome & Florence; 4) Painters from Venice; 5) Painters from Lombardy; 6) Painters from Germany and the Low Countries; 7) Painters from France and ending with his famous "Balance of painters". The book was finally published in 1699 following his appointment as Conseiller Honoraire to the Académie de peinture et de sculpture in Paris. 

Part 5, Painters from Lombardy, includes in order of appearance in the text, the following list of artists:

Antonio da Correggio (1489-1534), p 287
Agostino Carracci  (1557-1602), p 290
Lodovico Carracci (1555-1619), p 290
Annibale Carracci (1560-1609), p 290
Guido Reni (1575-1642), p 305
Domenichino (1581-1641), p 312
Giovanni Lanfranco (1582-1647), p 316
Francesco Albani (1578-1660), p 321
Guercino (1591-1666), p 324
Caravaggio (1571-1610), p 328
Bartolomeo Manfredi (1582-1622), p 332
Jusepe de Ribera (1591-1652), p 333

External links

 Online version (French) of 1715 version Abregé de la Vie des peintres By Roger de Piles on Google Books 
 Online version (Dutch) of 1725 version translated by Johannes Verhoek Beknopt verhaal van het Leven der Vermaardste Schilders By Roger de Piles at the University of Utrecht 

French art historians
Italian art historians
Art history books
Compilations of biographies about artists